Elections were held in the Australian state of Queensland on 9 October 1920 to elect the 72 members of the state's Legislative Assembly. The Labor government was seeking its third term in office since the 1915 election. It was Premier Ted Theodore's first election.

During the previous term, the Queensland Country Party, had re-emerged from the National bloc, taking half of the Country Party's parliamentary seats with it. A Labor member, Alfred James, switched to the party, and the Maranoa by-election in 1919 saw them gain a seat at the expense of Labor. An additional party, the Northern Country Party, also formed during this time to represent the interests of North Queensland farmers and canegrowers. To avoid three-cornered contests with Labor, the three parties agreed upon a division of seats between themselves.

Key dates

Results

|}

 462,218 electors were enrolled to vote at the election, but 2 Country Party seats (Cooroora and Cunningham), 1 United Party seat (Albert) and 1 Labor seat (Mitchell) were unopposed.

Seats changing party representation

This table lists changes in party representation at the 1920 election.

Party changes before election

The following seats changed party representation before the election due to the split of the National party.

Seats changing hands at election

 Members listed in italics did not recontest their seats.
 Sitting Country member for Maranoa, Thomas Spencer won this seat from Labor at the 1919 by-election.

See also
 Members of the Queensland Legislative Assembly, 1918–1920
 Members of the Queensland Legislative Assembly, 1920–1923
 Candidates of the Queensland state election, 1920
 Theodore Ministry

References

Elections in Queensland
1920 elections in Australia
1920s in Queensland
October 1920 events